The Eczacıbaşı family is a dynasty of Turkish businesspeople founded by Süleyman Ferit Eczacıbaşı, a self-made wealthy pharmacist. Third generation members of the family companies in Turkey established mostly by the efforts of his son Nejat Eczacıbaşı. After the death of the second generation members, the grandson of the founder, Bülent Eczacıbaşı and his brother Faruk Eczacıbaşı continued to run the Eczacıbaşı Holding and related companies.

Süleyman Ferit Eczacıbaşı (1885 İzmir–April 18, 1973) married Saffet Hanım 
Nejat Ferit Eczacıbaşı (January 5, 1913 İzmir-October 6, 1993 Philadelphia, USA) married Fatma Beyhan (née Ergene) (1923–2004)
Ferit Bülent Eczacıbaşı (1949 Istanbul) married 1980 Oya (née Esener) (1959)
Nejat Emre Eczacıbaşı (1984 Istanbul) married 2019 Dilara (Öztemir) 
Ela Defne Eczacıbaşı (2021 Istanbul) 
Esra Eczacıbaşı (1989 Istanbul) married 2018 Murat Coşkun
Nejat Kaya Coşkun (2021 Istanbul)
Rahmi Faruk Eczacıbaşı (1954 Istanbul) married Füsun (née Alpsoy) 
Sinan Eczacıbaşı
Murat Eczacıbaşı
Vedat Eczacıbaşı (1916 İzmir–September 4, 1961 Istanbul), married 1953 Gülçin
Deniz (Eczacıbaşı) Alatlı (f)
 Naz Alatli (f)
Saffet Pınar Eczacıbaşı (f)
Refika Başkır (f) (illegitimate daughter)
Sedat Eczacıbaşı (1917 İzmir–ca. 1950),
Kemal Eczacıbaşı (1918 İzmir–March 4, 1996 İzmir) married Zerrin,
Saima Filiz (Eczacıbaşı) Sarper (f)
Ferit Sarper
Selin Sarper
Haluk Eczacıbaşı (1921 İzmir–May 6, 1996)married Turkan,
Nukhet Eczacibasi (f)
Ali Atalik
Melih Eczacıbaşı (1923 İzmir–September 22, 2004 Istanbul) married Melek Nazan (née Altan),
Füsun Eczacıbaşı Güran (f)
Simla Guran (f)
Renin Ayse Saffet Eczacibasi (f)
Engin Egemen 
Zuzanna Nazan Egemen (f)
Atilla Osman Egemen 
Lara Egemen (f)
Melih Egemen 
Şakir Eczacıbaşı (1929 İzmir–January 23, 2010 Istanbul) married Saniha Sebla

Legend
f: female

References

 
Turkish families
Eczacibasi
Eczacibasi
Business families